The Class D was a class consisting of a single diesel locomotive with B wheel arrangement operated by the Chōsen Railway in colonial Korea. It was one of the first diesel locomotives to operate on the Korean peninsula.

Its fate after the Liberation and partition of Korea is unknown.

References

Locomotives of Korea
Railway locomotives introduced in 1932
B locomotives
Kisha Seizo locomotives
Narrow gauge diesel locomotives of Korea
Chosen Railway